"I'm Ready" is a 2004 English language song by French pop singer Cherie from her self-titled album Cherie. The song sampled the bassline from Foreigner's song "Urgent". This was also used as the opening song for the 2004 film Confessions of a Teenage Drama Queen and it's included in its soundtrack, four months before being released as a single.

Track listing
Single
"I'm Ready" – (3:21)
"Fool" – (3:40)

"I'm Ready" (The remixes)
"I'm Ready" (Dave Audé club mix) – (7:24)
"I'm Ready" (Mike Rizzo club mix) – (8:01)
"I'm Ready" (Dummies club mix) – (7:47)
"I'm Ready" (Silent Nick club mix) – (5:55)
"I'm Ready" (Dave Audé dub) – (8:37)
"I'm Ready" (Dummies dub) – (7:25)

Maxi CD
"I'm Ready" (Dave Aude club mix) – (7:24)
"I'm Ready" (Dummies club mix) – (7:47)
"I'm Ready" (Dummies dub) – (7:25)
"I'm Ready" (Mike Rizzo club mix) – (8:01)
"I'm Ready" (Silent Nick club mix) – (5:55)
"I'm Ready" (Dave Aude dub) – (8:37)
"I'm Ready" (Dave Aude edit) – (3:23)
"I'm Ready" (Dummies edit) – (3:23)
"I'm Ready" (Silent Nick edit) – (3:28)
"I'm Ready" (Mike Rizzo edit) – (3:39)
"I'm Ready" (Mike Rizzo Tribal dub) – (8:02)
"I'm Ready" (Mike Rizzo Grooveapella) – (7:03)

Charts
It reached No. 1 on the US Hot Dance Music/Club Play chart, becoming her biggest hit.

See also
List of number-one dance singles of 2004 (U.S.)
List of artists who reached number one on the US Dance chart

References

2004 songs
Lava Records singles
Songs written by Jamie Hartman
Songs written by Mick Jones (Foreigner)
Songs written by Sacha Skarbek
Songs written by Kara DioGuardi
Songs written by Lukas Burton